Lygistorrhina sanctaecatharinae is a species of long-beaked fungus gnat in the family Lygistorrhinidae. It is found in North America.

References

Sciaroidea
Articles created by Qbugbot
Insects described in 1975